Corocoro Island (Isla Corocoro) is an island near the mouth of the Amacuro River and in the delta of the Barima River in South America. The northernmost part of the land border between Guyana and Venezuela runs through the island. It is one of the few islands that is divided between more than one sovereign state. The vast majority of the island is Venezuelan territory (610 square kilometers) . The north side of the island is the Atlantic Ocean and the south side is the Barima River. Venezuela does not recognize the border that divides the island, since it considers its eastern part, as part of the claimed territory of  Guayana Esequiba. Venezuela claims the island in its entirety (689 square kilometers).

Reserve 
The Venezuelan-controlled part of 61,000 hectares or 610 km² is part of a natural reserve protected by the Venezuelan government, called the Imataca Reserve, and is part of the so-called Coastal Protection Zone.

See also
List of divided islands

River islands of Guyana
River islands of Venezuela
International islands
Guyana–Venezuela border
Islands of the North Atlantic Ocean
Disputed islands